Adelaide of Waldeck ( – ) was a daughter of Lord Henry III of Waldeck and his wife Matilda of Arnsberg-Cuyk (also known as Matilda of Rietberg-Arnsberg).

She married on 24 November 1276 to Simon I of Lippe and had the following children:
 Bernard (1277-1341), Bishop of Paderborn
 Herman (d. ), a cleric
 Hendrik (d. ), a cleric
 Diedrich (d. after 8 September 1326), Knight in the Teutonic Order
 Simon (d. )
 Otto († 1360), Lord of Lippe in Lemgo
 Bernard V (d. before 1365), Lord of Lippe in Rheda
 Adolph
 Matilda (d. after 9 April 1366), married  to John II, Count of Bentheim (d. 1332)
 Adelaide, married Herman II of Everstein-Polle (about September 29, 1324?) (d. )
 Hedwig (d. after March 5, 1369), married Count Adolph VII of Holstein-Pinneburg and Schauenburg (d. 1352)

External links 
 nhv-ahnenforschung.de

House of Lippe
House of Waldeck
1260s births
14th-century deaths
Year of birth unknown
Year of death unknown
Place of birth unknown
Place of death unknown
13th-century German nobility
14th-century German nobility
13th-century German women
14th-century German women
Daughters of monarchs